Aerolíneas Argentinas Flight 322 was a scheduled Buenos Aires–São Paulo–Port of Spain–New York City international passenger service, operated with a Comet 4, registration LV-AHR, that crashed during climbout on the early stages of its second leg, when it collided with tree tops shortly after takeoff from Viracopos-Campinas International Airport on 23 November 1961. There were 52 fatalities, 40 of them passengers.

Flight history 
It took off at 05:38, bound for Piarco International Airport, Trinidad, with New York City as its final destination. All 52 people on board were killed in the disaster.

Investigation 
The accident was investigated by the Brazilian government with participation from the government of Argentina, the state of registry of the accident aircraft.

According to the Brazilian Air Ministry, the weather conditions did not contribute to the accident.

The investigation revealed that the first officer was seated in the left seat of the flight deck, which the investigators saw as an indication that he was receiving flight instruction from the captain during the accident flight.

The Brazilian Air Ministry determined the following Probable Cause:
It was presumed that the co-pilot was under flight instruction. If such was the case, the instructor, who was pilot-in-command, may have failed to brief or supervise the co-pilot properly.

The Argentinian government issued the following statement:
Argentina has determined, in the light of information it has gathered, that the cause of the accident was: "Failure to operate under IFR during a takeoff by night in weather conditions requiring IFR operation and failure to follow the climb procedure for this type of aircraft; a contributory cause was the lack of vigilance by the pilot-in-command during the operations."

See also

Aerolíneas Argentinas accidents and incidents
List of accidents and incidents involving commercial aircraft

Footnotes

Notes

References

External links
Brazilian Air Ministry accident report on prevac.com.ar (Argentinian aviation safety website, in Spanish) (Archive)

1961 in Brazil
Airliner accidents and incidents caused by pilot error
Aviation accidents and incidents in 1961
Aviation accidents and incidents in Brazil
Accidents and incidents involving the de Havilland Comet
Aerolíneas Argentinas accidents and incidents
November 1961 events in South America